This is the discography of OPM band Rivermaya.

Albums

Studio albums

Extended plays (EP)

Live album
2002 — Live and Acoustic

Remix album
1998 — Remixed

Compilation albums
2001 — Rivermaya Greatest Hits
2005 — You'll Be Safe Here (Asian Edition)
2006 — Rivermaya: Greatest Hits 2006
2007 — The Best of Rivermaya (Malaysia Release)
2008 — Silver Series
2010 — 18 Greatest Hits

Singles

Collaborations 
1896 Ang Pagsilang (1996)
 "Panahon na Naman"
Gimmicknation (2002)
 "Alab ng Puso"
Pulp Freakshow: The Album (2002)
 "Basketbol"
Electrico - Hip City (2006)
 "All Around the World"

References

Discographies of Filipino artists
Pop music group discographies